Chantal Côté (born 16 February 1964) is a Canadian speed skater. She competed in two events at the 1988 Winter Olympics.

References

External links
 

1964 births
Living people
Canadian female speed skaters
Olympic speed skaters of Canada
Speed skaters at the 1988 Winter Olympics
People from Chibougamau
Universiade bronze medalists for Canada
Universiade medalists in short track speed skating
Competitors at the 1985 Winter Universiade
20th-century Canadian women